Felsőregmec is a village in the Borsod-Abaúj-Zemplén county in northeastern Hungary.

External links 
 Street map 

Populated places in Borsod-Abaúj-Zemplén County
Romanesque architecture in Hungary